Donald James Matthew Blakeslee (September 11, 1917 – September 3, 2008) was an officer in the United States Air Force, whose aviation career began as a pilot in the Royal Canadian Air Force flying Spitfire fighter aircraft during World War II. He then became a member of the Royal Air Force Eagle Squadrons, before transferring to the United States Army Air Forces in 1942. He flew more combat missions against the Luftwaffe than any other American fighter pilot, and by the end of the war was a flying ace credited with 15.5 aerial victories.

Early life
Blakeslee was born in Fairport Harbor, Ohio on September 11, 1917, and became interested in flying after watching the Cleveland Air Races as a young boy. With money saved from his job with the Diamond Alkali Company, he and a friend purchased a Piper J-3 in the mid-1930s, flying it from Willoughby Field, Ohio. However, his friend crashed the plane in 1940, and Blakeslee decided the best way to remain flying was to join the Royal Canadian Air Force (RCAF).

Military career

World War II

RCAF and Eagle Squadrons
After training in Canada, Blakeslee arrived in England on May 15, 1941, where he was assigned to No. 401 Squadron RCAF. The squadron was assigned to the Biggin Hill Wing. Flying sweeps over France, Pilot Officer Blakeslee seems to have first seen combat on November 18, 1941, when he damaged a Bf 109 near Le Touquet; and he claimed his first kill on November 22, 1941, a Bf 109 destroyed, over Desvres, about 10 miles south of Marck; on the same mission, he damaged a further Bf 109 whilst returning to base.  His next kills were not claimed until April 28, 1942, two Fw 190 probably destroyed. He proved to be not a particularly good shot, but was receptive to the principles involved in air fighting tactics, and was soon shown to be a gifted leader, in the air and on the ground.

By the summer of 1942 he was an acting flight lieutenant, and was awarded the British Distinguished Flying Cross on August 14, 1942.  The citation read:

He then completed his first tour of duty, clocking 200 combat hours with three victories.

Blakeslee had studiously avoided being part of the American volunteer Eagle Squadrons, claiming "they played sister in making their claims." But when told he would be assigned to be an instructor pilot, he finally volunteered to be sent to No. 133 (Eagle) Squadron RAF as its commanding officer, which was the only way he could remain on combat status. During the raid against Dieppe, France on August 18, 1942, Blakeslee shot down a further Fw 190, and another probably destroyed on the 19th, thus achieving ace status.

4th Fighter Group

On September 12, 1942, the 71, 121, and 133 Squadrons were "activated" as the USAAF's 4th Fighter Group, operating from a former RAF field at Debden. After a few months flying Spitfires, the group was re-equipped with the new Republic P-47 Thunderbolt. On April 15, 1943, Blakeslee claimed an Fw 190 for the group's first P-47 "kill", and claimed a further Fw 190 on May 14, 1943, both near Knocke. Leading the 335th Squadron of the 4th FG, Blakeslee flew the group into Germany for the first time on July 28. Towards the end of the year, Blakeslee led the group more often, and developed a tactic of circling above any air battle and directing his fighters as necessary.

Blakeslee flew the P-51 Mustang for the first time in December 1943 and thereafter worked hard to have the 4th FG re-equipped as soon as possible with the new fighter, pushing hard, especially as he now became commanding officer of the 4th on January 1, 1944. The 8th Air Force Command eventually agreed to the request, provided the pilots were operational on the P-51 within 24 hours of receiving them. Blakeslee agreed, instructing his pilots to "learn how to fly them on the way to the target".

On March 6, 1944, Blakeslee flew in the first Mustang over Berlin while defending Boeing B-17s and Consolidated B-24s. Escorting the massed daylight raids of the 8th Air Force over Occupied Europe while under Blakeslee's command, the 4th FG became one of the highest-scoring groups of VIII Fighter Command. The 4th's aggressive style was very effective, and the 4th Fighter Group passed the 500-kill mark at the end of April 1944. At the end of the war, the group had destroyed 1,020 German planes (550 in flight, and 470 on the ground).

The next landmark for Blakeslee was leading the first "shuttle" mission to Russia on June 21, 1944, flying 1,470 miles in a mission lasting over 7 hours.

Don Blakeslee was finally grounded in September 1944, after the loss of several high-scoring USAAF aces. He had accounted for 15.5 kills in the air and 2 more on the ground. He had flown over 500 operational sorties and accumulated 1,000 combat hours. Barrett Tillman, who served as an executive secretary of the American Fighter Aces Association, stated that Blakeslee had more missions and hours "than any other American fighter pilot of World War II". Blakeslee retired from the United States Air Force in 1965 with the rank of colonel.  An obituary in The Guardian further described him as: "the most decorated second world war US Army Air Force fighter pilot."

Blakeslee's personal standing among Allied pilots was considerable. British ace Johnnie Johnson described him as "one of the best leaders ever to fight over Germany".

Post war
Following the end of World War II, Blakeslee continued to serve in the newly-created U.S. Air Force. During the Korean War, he served as commander of the  27th Fighter-Escort Group at Taegu Air Base in South Korea and Itazuke Air Base in Japan, and flew several missions in the F-84 Thunderjet from December 1950 to March 1951. On March 1963, he was promoted to colonel and his final assignment was as Special Assistant to the Director of Operations for Seventeenth Air Force, from December 1964 until he retirement from the Air Force on April 30, 1965.

Awards and honors
His awards include:

1st Distinguished Service Cross citation

Blakeslee, Donald J.M.
Colonel (Air Corps), U.S. Army Air Forces
4th Fighter Group, 8th Air Force
Date of Action:  January 7, 1944

Citation:

The President of the United States of America, authorized by Act of Congress July 9, 1918, takes pleasure in presenting the Distinguished Service Cross to Colonel (Air Corps) Donald James Mathew Blakeslee, United States Army Air Forces, for extraordinary heroism in connection with military operations against an armed enemy while serving as Pilot of a P-51 Fighter Airplane in the 4th Fighter Group, Eighth Air Force, in aerial combat against enemy forces in the vicinity of Headin, France. Colonel Blakeslee, on 7 January 1944, after engaging a flight of six enemy aircraft intent on the destruction of crippled and straggling heavy bombers, observed ten to twelve FW-190's attacking unescorted bombers which were above him. Though attacked by three enemy aircraft from astern and flying into heavy and accurate fire which struck and damaged his aircraft, Colonel Blakeslee, disregarding damage, unfavorable altitude, obscured vision from spraying oil, and enemy superiority, climbed into the mass of enemy aircraft which he attacked and scattered, pursuing one of them through the haze to 2,000 feet, where he destroyed it before escape could be accomplished. Colonel Blakeslee's courage, aggressiveness, and will to destroy the enemy in the face of overwhelming odds reflect the greatest credit upon himself and the Armed Forces of the United States.

2nd Distinguished Service Cross citation

Blakeslee, Donald J.M.
Colonel (Air Corps), U.S. Army Air Forces
4th Fighter Group, 8th Air Force
Date of Action:  June 21, 1944 to July 5, 1944

Citation:

The President of the United States of America, authorized by Act of Congress July 9, 1918, takes pleasure in presenting a Bronze Oak Leaf Cluster in lieu of a Second Award of the Distinguished Service Cross to Colonel (Air Corps) Donald James Mathew Blakeslee, United States Army Air Forces, for extraordinary heroism in connection with military operations against an armed enemy while serving as Pilot of a P-51 Fighter Airplane in the 4th Fighter Group, Eighth Air Force, in aerial combat against enemy forces during the period from 21 June 1944 to 5 July 1944. During this period Colonel Blakeslee led a fighter escort in protection of bombers on the longest escort mission in fighter plane history, the first shuttle mission from England to Russia and return by way of Italy. On this unprecedented mission Colonel Blakeslee overcame the obstacles of poor navigational facilities, adverse weather, and enemy fighter opposition in such a manner that no bombers were lost while being escorted. While sweeping in front of the oncoming bombers on the mission over Budapest on 2 July 1944, he observed 50 enemy single-engine aircraft above him and about to attack the bombers. He immediately led his flight of four aircraft to attack, disregarding all odds and disadvantage of altitude. Joined later by his quadroon's two other flights, the enemy attack was completely disrupted and ten of his aircraft destroyed- -Colonel Blakeslee personally destroying one of them. His courageous leadership and heroic action on this occasion reflect the highest credit upon himself and the Armed Forces of the United States.

Personal life and death
After retiring, Blakeslee lived in Miami, Florida. Blakeslee married Leola Fryer (died in 2005) in 1944 and had one daughter. Blakeslee died on September 3, 2008, at his home due to heart failure.

On Friday September 18, 2008, Colonel Don Blakeslee and his wife's ashes were interred at Arlington National Cemetery.  The ceremony took place at 1100 hours and was open to the public.  The 4th Fighter Wing also did a flyover at the ceremony.

See also

List of World War II air aces

References

External links
Don Blakeslee at acesofww2.com
Washington Post obituary
Donald James Matthew "Don" Blakeslee
Don Blakeslee – USAAF
Don Blakeslee – Riddle Field
 4th Fighter Group Association WWII

1917 births
2008 deaths
People from Lake County, Ohio
Aviators from Ohio
United States Army Air Forces pilots of World War II
United States Army Air Forces colonels
American Royal Air Force pilots of World War II
American World War II flying aces
Royal Canadian Air Force personnel of World War II
Recipients of the Distinguished Flying Cross (United Kingdom)
Recipients of the Legion of Merit
Recipients of the Silver Star
Recipients of the Distinguished Flying Cross (United States)
Recipients of the Distinguished Service Cross (United States)
United States Air Force colonels
Recipients of the Air Medal
Burials at Arlington National Cemetery
Royal Canadian Air Force officers
Recipients of the Croix de Guerre 1939–1945 (France)
United States Air Force personnel of the Korean War
American Korean War pilots
Military personnel from Ohio